Fawn River State Fish Hatchery, also known as the Orland Fish Hatchery, is a historic hatchery located at Orland and Millgrove Township, Steuben County, Indiana. It was developed between 1935 and 1937 by the Works Progress Administration, and dedicated in 1942. Contributing resources include the entrance arch, fieldstone bridge, eight rearing ponds, the property manager's residence, the Colonial Revival style hatchery building, a dam impounding the supply pond, four small pools, and six large rearing ponds.

It was listed on the National Register of Historic Places in 1997.

References

External links
Indiana Department of Natural Resources: Fawn River State Fish Hatchery

Works Progress Administration in Indiana
Agricultural buildings and structures on the National Register of Historic Places in Indiana
Colonial Revival architecture in Indiana
Buildings and structures completed in 1937
Buildings and structures in Steuben County, Indiana
National Register of Historic Places in Steuben County, Indiana